James Edward McKinley (October 11, 1917 – July 30, 2004) was an American character actor. He frequently played authority figures, including lawmen or medical personnel.

McKinley was born in Seattle, Washington. He got his early break in Hollywood in the late 1950s, when he began appearing in episodes of many television series. His film work included Advise & Consent, The Angry Red Planet, A Thunder of Drums, the abortion drama The Case of Patty Smith, and Blake Edwards' comedy The Party (1968), in which he played Fred Clutterbuck, the studio head and party host.

Airing on 3/16/1965, the episode "By The Numbers, Paint!" of the 1960s American Television series McHale's Navy, McKinley plays visiting Senator Duncan.  (1965 - Season 3, Episode 26
)
Other notable Television roles included parts on The Donna Reed Show, Hazel, Bewitched, The Andy Griffith Show, Surfside 6, Sugarfoot, Ben Casey, 77 Sunset Strip, Perry Mason, Ironside, Marcus Welby, M.D., The Rockford Files, Eight Is Enough, Bret Maverick, Little House on the Prairie, The Wild Wild West, and in 1986 Highway to Heaven, his final appearance. McKinley died in Beverly Hills, California and is buried at Holy Cross Cemetery in Culver City, California.

Partial filmography

You Bet Your Life (1956) - Contestant
The Big Circus (1959) - Circus Performer (uncredited)
The Angry Red Planet (1959) - Prof. Paul Weiner
The Walking Target (1960) - Warden John B. Haggerty (uncredited)
Cimarron (1960) - Beck (uncredited)
A Fever in the Blood (1961) - Joe Whelan (uncredited)
Ada (1961) - Robert Keely (uncredited)
A Thunder of Drums (1961) - Capt. Alan Scarborough
The George Raft Story (1961) - Studio Head (uncredited)
Window on Main Street (1961, TV series) - Tom Rafferty (episode "Day in the Life of the Editor")
Patty (1962) - Dr. Miller
Advise & Consent (1962) - Senator Powell Hanson
The Interns (1962) - Dr. Robert Bonny
How the West Was Won (1962) - Auctioneer (uncredited)
The Time Travelers (1964) - Raymond
The Great Race (1965) - Chairman (uncredited)
"The Andy Griffith Show" {1965) - Governor George C. Handley
The Ghost and Mr. Chicken (1966) - Mayor Carlyle Preston (uncredited)
The Street Is My Beat (1966) - Danby
Batman (1967, TV series) - Mr. Flamm (year 2, episodes 47 and 48)
The Last Challenge (1967) - John Grant (uncredited)
The Ballad of Josie (1967) - Stokey (uncredited)
The Party (1968) - Fred Clutterbuck
The Impossible Years (1968) - Dr. Pepperell
Charro! (1969) - Henry Carter
There Was a Crooked Man... (1970) - The Governor
How Do I Love Thee? (1970) - Hugo Wellington
Flap (1970) - Harris
Where Does It Hurt? (1972) - Geo. Leffingwell, M.D.
Airport 1975 (1974) - Passenger (uncredited)
At Long Last Love (1975) - Billings

References

External links

1917 births
2004 deaths
American male television actors
20th-century American male actors